Pseudomiza aurata is a species of moth of the family Geometridae first described by Alfred Ernest Wileman in 1915. It is found in Taiwan and China.

References

Moths described in 1915
Ennominae